Tinker Ticker is a 2013 South Korean crime drama film written and directed by Kim Jung-hoon in his first feature-length for his Korean Academy of Film Arts (KAFA) graduation project. Starring Byun Yo-han and Park Jung-min, it follows a bombmaker who meets a detonator.

It made its world premiere at the 26th Tokyo International Film Festival (TIFF) in 2013, competing in the inaugural Best Asian Future Film Award category.

Plot

Cast
 Byun Yo-han as Park Jung-gu
 Park Jung-min as Lee Hyo-min
 Kim Hee-chang as Professor Baek
 Oh Chang-kyung as Detective Oh 
 Park Seong-il as Han Gyoo-nam
 Yoon Dae Hyung as Pil-gyoon 
 Lee Si-won as Si-won
 Um Tae-hwa

Awards and nominations

Reception

References

External links
 
 
 

2013 films
2013 crime drama films
2010s Korean-language films
South Korean crime drama films
2010s South Korean films